La conjura de El Escorial (The Escorial Conspiracy) is a 2008 Spanish historical drama film directed by Antonio del Real and starring Jason Isaacs, Julia Ormond, Jordi Mollà, Pilar Bastardés and Jürgen Prochnow. It is set in the reign of Philip II of Spain.

Plot
On the night of Easter Monday March 31, 1578, assassins murdered the treasury secretary Juan de Escobedo in cold blood in the royal palace of El Escorial.  A series of investigations ensue that are aimed at people close to the Court of Philip II.

Cast
Jason Isaacs  as  Antonio Pérez, royal secretary 
Julia Ormond  as  Princess of Éboli 
Jürgen Prochnow  as  Captain Espinosa 
 Blanca Jara as Damiana, the servant girl, the love of Captain Espinosa
Jordi Mollà  as  Mateo Vázquez, the investigating Jesuit father
Joaquim de Almeida  as  Juan de Escobedo, secretary of Don Juan
Juanjo Puigcorbé  as  King Philip II of Spain
William Miller  as Captain Rodrigo de Villena
Fabio Testi  as Duke of Alba

Historical note
This fictional story  is not to be confused with The El Escorial Conspiracy led by Crown Prince Ferdinand which occurred in 1807 during the reign of Ferdinand's father Charles IV of Spain.

References

External links
 
 

2008 films
2000s historical drama films
Spanish historical drama films
2000s Spanish-language films
Films directed by Antonio del Real
Films set in the 1570s
Films shot in the Community of Madrid
Films set in Spain
Cultural depictions of Fernando Álvarez de Toledo, 3rd Duke of Alba
2008 drama films
Historical mystery films
Cultural depictions of Ana de Mendoza y de Silva, Princess of Éboli
2000s English-language films
2008 multilingual films
Spanish multilingual films
2000s Spanish films